Penumantra is a village in West Godavari district of the Indian state of Andhra Pradesh. The village is the site of the headquarters of Penumantra Mandal.

Demographics 

 Census of India, Penumantra had a population of 10658. The total population constitute, 5247 males and 5411 females with a sex ratio of 1031 females per 1000 males. 960 children are in the age group of 0–6 years, with sex ratio of 1000 The average literacy rate stands at 78.13%.

References 

Villages in West Godavari district